Rhodomyrtus psidioides, the native guava, is a shrub or small rainforest tree up to  high, member of the botanical family Myrtaceae, native to eastern Australia.

Oil glands are numerous, and the leaves have a pineapple-like fragrance and stickiness when crushed.

Uses
The berry of native guava is edible with a pleasant aromatic flavor. The tree is fast growing and has an important successional role in rainforest regeneration.

References

Myrtaceae
Plants described in 1832